is a train station in the town of Mihama, Chita District, Aichi Prefecture, Japan, operated by Meitetsu.

Lines

Station layout
The station has two elevated opposed side platforms serving two tracks, with Platform 2 on a passing loop. The station building is located underneath. The station has automated ticket machines, Manaca automated turnstiles and is staffed.

Platforms

Adjacent stations

Station history
Noma Station was opened on April 4, 1976, as the initial terminal station of the Chita New Line. The line was extended to Utsumi Station in 1980. In 2007, the Tranpass system of magnetic fare cards with automatic turnstiles was implemented.

Passenger statistics
In fiscal 2018, the station was used by an average of 321 passengers daily.

Surrounding area
Noma Junior High School
Noma Daibo temple

See also
 List of Railway Stations in Japan

References

External links

 Official web page 

Railway stations in Japan opened in 1976
Railway stations in Aichi Prefecture
Stations of Nagoya Railroad
Mihama, Aichi